is a Shinto shrine located in Ōgaki, Gifu Prefecture, Japan. It is located near the base of Ōgaki Castle. The shrine is designated to the approximately 19,000 people from the Seino and Hida regions of Gifu Prefecture who died during wars. Because it represented only a small portion of the prefecture, it was eventually replaced by the Gifu Gokoku Shrine.

History
The shrine was originally built in 1871 to honor the 54 men from the area who had died during the Boshin War. Originally, it was called Ōgaki Shōkonsha (大垣招魂社). The shrine was replaced by the Gifu Gokoku Shrine in nearby Gifu after it was completed in 1940.

The shrines two festival days are April 23 and September 22.

See also
Gifu Gokoku Shrine
Hida Gokoku Shrine

References

Shinto shrines in Gifu Prefecture
Gokoku shrines